Douglas Ferguson Allen (born November 13, 1951) is a former American football linebacker who played two seasons with the Buffalo Bills of the National Football League (NFL). He was drafted by the Bills in the second round of the 1974 NFL Draft. He played college football at Pennsylvania State University and attended Corning Painted Post West High School in Painted Post, New York.

Allen, who received a degree in Labor & Employment Relations from Penn State, retired to accept a position with the AFL-CIO.  He later joined the NFL Players Association, spending 25 years there and rising to the position of Deputy Director under Gene Upshaw, and President of their Players, Inc. subsidiary.  He then spent three years as Executive Director of the Screen Actors Guild before returning to Penn State as a Professor from Practice in Labor.

References

External links
Just Sports Stats

Living people
1951 births
Players of American football from Tampa, Florida
American football linebackers
Penn State Nittany Lions football players
Buffalo Bills players